Abdulai Hamid Charm (born 20 July 1963) is a Sierra Leonean judge, who was formerly the Chief Justice of Sierra Leone until his resignation in December 2018.

He is the first Chief Justice of Sierra Leone born outside of the capital Freetown since the establishment of the Supreme Court in 1960.

Early life and education
Abdulai Hamid Charm was born in the small rural town of Kaula, Kambia District in the Northern Province of Sierra Leone. Charm was born and raised to Muslim parents, and a Muslim himself.

Justice Charm received a Bachelor of Laws with Honours in 1990 from Fourah Bay College, and a Certificate for Call to the Bar in October 1991 from the Sierra Leone Law School. In 2000 he received a Master of Laws in Human Rights and Democratization in Africa from the University of Pretoria.

Career

From 1992 to 1999 he worked for the Director of Public Prosecutions Division of the Law Officers’ Department as State Counsel, and from 1999 to 2001 as Senior State Counsel. In 2001, he co-founded the first legal aid centre in Sierra Leone – the Lawyers Centre for Legal Assistance (LAWCLA) and served as Director of Litigation from 2002 to 2003. From January 2002 to October 2003 he was a lawyer in private practice.

From 2003 to 2010 he worked for Sierra Leone's National Revenue Authority: as Principal Collector, Board Secretariat, and Legal Affairs from 2003 to 2005; as Deputy Commissioner, Board Secretariat, and Board Secretary from 2005 to 2007; and as Director of Policy and Legal Affairs from 2007 to 2010. In 2010, he briefly returned to private practice before being appointed a Judge of the High Court in June 2011, and then a Judge of the Court of Appeal in 2014. He was also appointed a Judge of the Residual Special Court for Sierra Leone in 2013.

He was nominated as Chief Justice by President Ernest Bai Koroma on 28 December 2015, and after being approved by Parliament on 15 January 2016, he was sworn in as Sierra Leone's Chief Justice on 21 January 2016, succeeding retired Chief Justice Umu Hawa Tejan-Jalloh.

References

External links
 LAWCLA- About Us

Fourah Bay College alumni
Chief justices of Sierra Leone
Living people
1962 births
People from Kambia District
Sierra Leonean Muslims
University of Pretoria alumni